Lindsay van Zundert (born 1 February 2005) is a Dutch figure skater. She is the 2021 Celje Open champion, the 2020 NRW Trophy champion, and the 2021 Dutch national champion.

Personal life 
Van Zundert was born on 1 February 2005 in Etten-Leur. As of 2020, she is currently a mavo-4 student at Graaf Engelbrecht in Breda.

Career

Early career 
Van Zundert began skating at the age of seven. She competed at domestic Belgian competitions early in her career. In 2015, van Zundert began training under Ans Bocklandt in Courchevel, France and Wilrijk, Belgium.

Van Zundert is the 2017 and 2018 Dutch advanced novice national champion. She also won the 2019 Dutch junior national title, but was not sent to the 2019 World Junior Championships.

2019–2020 season 
Van Zundert attended several training seminars both abroad in Andorra, France, and the United States, as well as domestic ones sponsored by Joan Haanappel's Netherlands Figure Skating Foundation. She went door-to-door in Etten-Leur to collect donations and bottles to finance her trips.

Van Zundert made her Junior Grand Prix debut at 2019 JGP France, finishing 21st. Her result was insufficient to earn the Netherlands a spot at the 2020 Winter Youth Olympics. Van Zundert then finished sixth at the Tallinn Trophy. She won her first international medal, silver, at the Santa Claus Cup. After a fourth-place finish at the 2020 Bavarian Open, van Zundert was named to the 2020 World Junior Championships team. She defended her junior national title the following month. At Junior Worlds, van Zundert finished 29th in the short program and did not qualify to the final segment.

2020–2021 season 
Due to the cancellation of the Junior Grand Prix, van Zundert opened her season by making her senior international debut at the 2020 CS Nebelhorn Trophy, where she was the youngest competitor. She earned all personal bests to finish seventh overall. Her coach could not travel from Belgium, and she was accompanied by Lorenzo Magri, an Italian coach she knew from training. After the competition, she announced she was leaving her longtime coach, Ans Bocklandt, to train under Jorik Hendrickx and Carine Herrygers in Eindhoven and Tilburg. In November, van Zundert won her first international title at the 2020 NRW Trophy, ahead of Josefin Taljegård and Jenni Saarinen. Her results earned her the technical minimums for the 2021 European Championships. Van Zundert competed at several other Senior Bs throughout the season, winning medals at the Winter Star (silver) and Celje Open (gold).

Although the European Championships were eventually cancelled, van Zundert was able to earn her technical minimums at the 2021 Challenge Cup to earn a berth on the Dutch team for the 2021 World Championships in Stockholm. As the highest-ranked Dutch skater at Challenge Cup, she also earned her first senior national title. At the World Championships, she received a short program score of 57.72, which qualified her for the free skate in twenty-fourth position, the last skater to make the cut. In the free skate, she scored a new personal best of 116.78 and moved up to sixteenth position. Van Zundert's ranking qualified a berth for a Dutch skater at the 2022 Winter Olympics in Beijing. This was the first time the Netherlands had qualified in the Olympic ladies' event since Dianne de Leeuw in 1976. She remarked, "I have worked so hard for it, and I have given so much; it gives such a great feeling that I have achieved this."

2021–2022 season 
Van Zundert began the season at the 2021 CS Lombardia Trophy, where she placed seventh. She attempted a triple Lutz-triple toe loop combination in competition for the first time. She was eleventh at the 2021 CS Finlandia Trophy. She competed at the NRW Trophy in early November. She was second after the short program, won the free skate and placed first overall to win her second straight title at the event.

In late November, van Zundert was officially nominated to the Dutch Olympic team. In January, she was named co-flagbearer for the opening ceremony, alongside speed skater Kjeld Nuis. Shortly afterward she made her debut at the European Championships but had a disappointing outing when she failed to advance to the free skate and finished in twenty-seventh place. Coach Carine Herrygers opined, "she has put too much pressure on herself in recent weeks" and "in that respect, it has been a good lesson for the Games."

Competing in the 2022 Winter Olympics in the short program of the women's event, Van Zundert came twenty-second, qualifying for the free skate. Sixteenth in the free skate, she rose to eighteenth overall.

Following the Olympics, Van Zundert attended the 2022 Challenge Cup, which includes the Dutch national championships. She was tenth after the short program, 0.71 points clear of Niki Wories, her direct competition for the Dutch title. With a wider margin of 13.24 points in the free program, she retained the Dutch title while ending up seventh overall in the Challenge Cup. Van Zundert ended her season with a seventeenth place at the 2022 World Championships.

2022–2023 season 
Van Zundert began the season with a ninth placement at the 2022 CS Nebelhorn Trophy. To her surprise, she was invited to appear twice on the senior Grand Prix, making her debut at the 2022 Skate Canada International. Despite finishing eleventh of twelve skaters, she expressed satisfaction, saying it was a "huge learning experience to be here. Just to experience how such a match goes." She then finished eleventh once again at the 2022 Grand Prix de France.

Programs

Competitive highlights 
GP: Grand Prix; CS: Challenger Series; JGP: Junior Grand Prix

References

External links 
 

2005 births
Living people
Dutch female single skaters
People from Etten-Leur
Figure skaters at the 2022 Winter Olympics
Olympic figure skaters of the Netherlands
21st-century Dutch women
Sportspeople from North Brabant